Edwin Sánchez Anzola (born 20 July 1983 in Caparrapi) is a Colombian cyclist, who currently rides for Aguardiente Néctar–IMRD–Chía–Cundinamarca.

Major results
2007
 3rd Overall Tour de Guadeloupe
1st Mountains classification
1st Stage 6
2008
 3rd Overall Tour de Guadeloupe
2009
 3rd Overall Tour de Guadeloupe
2010
 3rd Overall Tour de Guadeloupe
1st Stage 8b
2013
 1st Overall Vuelta a la Independencia Nacional
2014
 1st Overall Vuelta a la Independencia Nacional
2015
 1st Stage 4 Vuelta a Colombia
2018
 1st Stage 7 Tour de Guadeloupe
2019
 7th Overall Tour de Guadeloupe
2021
 5th Overall Tour de Guadeloupe

References

1983 births
Living people
Colombian male cyclists
People from Cundinamarca Department